Taq-e Bostan is a site with a series of large rock reliefs from the era of the Sassanid Empire of Persia (Iran), carved around the 4th century CE.

This example of Persian Sassanid art is located 5 km from the city center of Kermanshah. It is located in the heart of the Zagros mountains, where it has endured almost 1,700 years of wind and rain. Originally, several natural springs were visible next to and below the reliefs and arches, some of which are now covered. Springs  next to the reliefs still feed a large basin in front of the rock. The site has been turned into an archaeological park and a series of late Sassanian and Islamic column capitals have been brought together (some found at Taq Bostan, others at Mount Behistun and Kermanshah).

The carvings, some of the finest and best-preserved examples of Persian sculpture under the Sassanids, include representations of the investitures of Ardashir II (379–383) and Shapur III (383–388). Like other Sassanid symbols, Taq-e Bostan, and its relief patterns accentuate power, religious tendencies, glory, honor, the vastness of the court, game and fighting spirit, festivity, joy, and rejoicing.

Sassanid kings chose a beautiful setting for their rock reliefs along an historic Silk Road caravan route waypoint and campground. The reliefs are adjacent to sacred springs that empty into a large reflecting pool at the base of a mountain cliff.

Taq-e Bostan and its rock relief are one of the 30 surviving Sassanid relics of the Zagros mountains. According to Arthur Pope, the founder of the Iranian Art and Archeology Institute in the United States of America, "art was characteristic of the Iranian people and the gift which they endowed the world with."

Description of the rock reliefs
The Taq-e Bostan complex comprise a rock relief standing on its own and several more reliefs associated with two rock cut arches. They illustrate the investiture ceremonies of the kings Ardashir II, Shapur II, Shapur III and Khosrau II. They also depict the hunting scenes of Khosrau II.

Investiture of Ardashir II 

The first Taq-e Bostan relief, and apparently the oldest, is a rock relief of the crowning ceremony of Ardashir II (379-383 AD) by his predecessor Shapur II or Ahura Mazda (although even the middle figure is wearing a Sassanian crown, with the balloon-like top/compartment [apparently to hold their hair in], and the figure to his left is the receiver of the ring; so he could not be Ahura Mazda, either). Researchers long debated the identities of the figures in this relief but is now ascertained that Ardashir II receives the beribboned ring - symbol of royal investiture - from his predecessor Shapur II or Ahura Mazda. There may be a deliberate mixture of the iconography of both identities. The two main figures are standing on the fallen Roman emperor Julianus Apostata (361-363 AD). Ardashir played an important role in his defeat during the reign of Shapur II (309-379 AD). Exceptional within Sasanian art is the fact that this is a portrait, based on the image of Julianus Apostata as it appears on Roman coins. Ardashir II was installed as interim ruler, awaiting the coming of age of the royal heir Shapur III (383-388 AD). The fourth figure is the god Mithra who holds a barsum in his hands and stands on a lotus flower. He is the protector of oaths and is witness to this pact. 
Local beliefs and Persian folk tale interpreted the scene as the victory of the first Sasanian kings on Artabanus IV, the last king of the Parthian dynasty. The Mithra figure became the visual inspiration for representations of the prophet Zoroaster.

The relief panel is approx. 4.07 m wide and 3.9 m high.

Shapur II and Shapur III 

The smaller arch or iwan (Taq-e Bustan II) has, on the upper part of the back wall, two Pahlavi inscriptions identifying two royal figures as Shapur II (Shapur the Great) and his son Shapur III. They are shown facing each other. The arch's vestibule measures 6 x 5 x 3.6 meters. It has been suggested as having been built during the reign of Shapur III and some put the date of its completion at 385 AD. However, the royal crown of Shapur III does not agree with those on his coins and is closer to that of his predecessor Ardashir II. It has been argued that the texts represent an usurpation of Ardashir's relief by Shapur III. The translation of the inscriptions follows:

Shapur II inscription :

This is the figure of Mazda-worshipping Lord Shapur, the king of kings of Iran and Aniran, whose race is from the Gods. Son of Mazda-worshipping Lord Hormizd, the king of kings of Iran and Aniran, whose race is from the Gods, grandson of Lord Nersi, the Shahanshah (king of kings).

Shapur III inscription:

This is the figure of Mazda-worshipping Lord Shapur, the king of kings of Iran and Aniran, whose race is from the Gods. Son of Mazda-worshipping Lord Shapur, the king of kings of Iran and Aniran, whose race is from the Gods, grandson of Lord Hormizd, the king of kings.

The figures of the two kings have been carved in low relief, looking at each other. Each figure is ca. 2.97 meters. Shapur II is on the right and Shapur III is on the left. Their hands are placed on a long straight sword which point downwards. The right hand is holding the grip and the left rests on the sheath. Both figures wear loose trousers, necklaces, curled hair, and a pointed beard ending in a ring.

Iwan of Khusrow II 
The three figures on the back wall of the large iwan are usually considered to represent Khosrow Parviz flanked by Ahura Mazda and Anahita. They are placed above a mounted Persian knight, thought to be Khusrow himself riding his favourite horse, Shabdiz. There is, however, no unanimity about the exact identification of this late Sasanian king. The two attending figures are sometimes considered to be a priest and a priestess, rather than the gods Ahura Mazda and Anahita themselves.

One of the most impressive reliefs inside the largest grotto or ivan is the gigantic equestrian figure of the Sassanid king Khosrau II (591-628 CE) mounted on his favorite charger, Shabdiz. Both horse and rider are arrayed in full battle armor.

The front of the rock-cut arch bears delicately carved patterns showing the tree of life or the sacred tree. Above the arch and located on two opposite sides are figures of two winged women with diadems.

Equestrian relief panel measured on 16.08.07 approx. 7.45m across by 4.25 m high

Scene of boar and deer hunting

On the right and left wall of the arch, there is a picture of the king's hunting measuring 3.8 X 5.7 meters. From the time of Cyrus the Great to the end of Sassanid period, hunting was one of the most favourite activities of Iranian kings. Therefore, scenes of hunting are frequently found next to those of crownings.

There are two hunting scenes on each side of the ivan. One scene depicts the imperial boar hunt, and in a similar spirit, the other scene shows the king stalking deer. Five elephants flush out the fleeing boars from a marshy lake for the king who stands poised with bow and arrow in hand while being serenaded by female musicians. In the next scene, another boat carries female harpists and shows that the king has killed two large boars. The next boat shows the king standing with a semicircular halo around his head and a loose bow in his hand, meaning the hunt is over. Under this picture, elephants are retrieving the game with their trunks and putting them on their backs. Several episodes of the royal hunt are thus shown at the same time.

These royal hunting scenes are among the most vivid and highly narrative murals immortalized in stone.

Panel depicting boar hunt measured on 16.08.07 as approx. 6.0 m wide x 4.25 m high

Panel depicting deer hunt measured on 16.08.07 as approx. 5.9 m wide x 4.35 m high

Dowlatshah Relief 
Jumping 1300 years in time the upper relief shows the 19th century Qajar Governor in Kermanshah city, Dowlatshah carving a relief in a big arch.

Taq-e Bostan Photos

See also
 Taq Kasra
 Taq-e Gara
 Sassanid architecture
 Naghsh-e Rajab
 Naqsh-e Rustam
 Bishapur
 List of colossal sculptures in situ

References

 Dr. Ali Akbar Sarfaraz, Dr. Bahman Firuzmandi "Mad, Hakhamanishi, Ashkani, Sasani" Marlik, 1996. 
 Gardeshgary magazine Vol. 13, September 2002
 Iranian Cultural News Agency (CHN)
 Bruno Overlaet, Ardashir II or Shapur III?: reflections on the identity of a king in the smaller grotto at Taq-i Bustan, IRANICA ANTIQUA 46, 2011, p. 235-250 
 Bruno Overlaet, Ahura Mazda or Shapur II? A Note on Taq-i Bustan I, the Investiture of Ardashir II (379-383), Iranica Antiqua 47, 2012, p. 133-151  
 Bruno Overlaet, And Man Created God? Kings, Priests and Gods on Sasanian Investiture Reliefs. Iranica Antiqua 48, 2013, 313-354.

External links

 Ernst Herzfeld Papers, Series 5: Drawings and Maps, Records of Taq-e Bostan Site Collections Search Center, S.I.R.I.S., Smithsonian Institution, Washington, D.C.
 Photos of Taq-e Bostan
 Taq Bostan (Video)
 Kermanshah and Taq-e Bostan

Buildings and structures completed in the 4th century
Sasanian architecture
Persian art
Archaeological sites in Iran
Architecture in Iran
Kurdish words and phrases
Tourist attractions in Kermanshah Province
Sculpture of the Ancient Near East
Buildings and structures in Kermanshah
Rock reliefs in Iran